Oleksandr Vechtomov (born 11 January 1988) is a Ukrainian professional footballer who plays as a centre-back for Grün-Weiß Lübben.

Career
Vechtomov is a product of the FC Zmina-Obolon Kyiv and FC Schaslyve youth sport schools and spent a career playing for the different lower leagues' Ukrainian teams. In July 2017 he signed a contract with FC Arsenal Kyiv.

References

External links
 

1988 births
Living people
Footballers from Kyiv
Ukrainian footballers
Ukrainian expatriate footballers
Association football defenders
FC Krymteplytsia Molodizhne players
FC Nyva Vinnytsia players
FC Zirka Kropyvnytskyi players
FC Obolon-2 Kyiv players
FC Bukovyna Chernivtsi players
PFC Sumy players
FC Naftovyk-Ukrnafta Okhtyrka players
FC Inhulets Petrove players
FC Arsenal Kyiv players
FC Polissya Zhytomyr players
Ukrainian First League players
Ukrainian expatriate sportspeople in Georgia (country)
Expatriate footballers in Georgia (country)
Ukrainian expatriate sportspeople in Germany
Expatriate footballers in Germany
FC Shevardeni-1906 Tbilisi players
FC VPK-Ahro Shevchenkivka players